Isaac Paha is a Ghanaian football coach and former player, he played with Sekondi Hasaacas in th 1980s.

Playing career
Paha is a former member of the Black Stars and was the captain of the team in 1984.

Coaching career
His most recent coaching position was with the Ghana women's national football team, which he was sacked from in March 2008.

Personal life 
Paha is the younger brother of fellow professional football P.S.K. Paha, who served as the assistant captain when the Black Stars won the 1978 African Cup of Nations, the 3rd title for Ghana.

References

1953 births
Living people
Ghanaian footballers
1982 African Cup of Nations players
1984 African Cup of Nations players
Association football defenders
Sekondi Hasaacas F.C. players
2007 FIFA Women's World Cup managers
Ghana international footballers
Ghana women's national football team managers
Africa Cup of Nations-winning players
Ghanaian football managers